Nkolo Fuma Airport  is an airport serving the village of Kolo Fuma in Kongo Central Province, Democratic Republic of the Congo.

See also

Transport in the Democratic Republic of the Congo
List of airports in the Democratic Republic of the Congo

References

External links
 FallingRain - Nkolo Fuma
 HERE Maps - Nkolo Fuma
 OpenStreetMap - Nkolo Fuma
 OurAirports - Nkolo Fuma Airport

Airports in Kongo Central Province